Pavayil is a small village in Kozhikode district of Kerala state, South India. It is located near the Akalapuzha River - ecotourism has begun to grow in the area. A festival of the same name takes place in April. The Kerala Lalitakala Academy organizes artistic day-camps and activities during the Pavayil Festival, such as a painting camps.

References 

Geography of Kozhikode district
Kozhikode north